Isaiah 42 is the forty-second chapter of the Book of Isaiah in both the Hebrew Bible and the Old Testament of the Christian Bible. This book contains the prophecies attributed to the prophet Isaiah, and is a part of the Books of the Prophets. Chapters 40-55 are known as "Deutero-Isaiah" and date from the time of the Israelites' exile in Babylon. This chapter contains a poem known as the first of the "Servant songs" about the servant, whom Jewish tradition holds that Isaiah identifies as either the Israelites themselves (or l'goyim) or Cyrus (in contrast to Jewish Christian and, thus, later gentile Christian tradition, as well as Islamic tradition).

Scholars such as John Goldingay, John Barton, and John Muddiman also hold the view that the Old Testament identifies the servant of the Servant songs as the Israelites in Is. 41:8-9; Is. 44:1; Is. 44:21; Is. 45:4; Is. 48:20 and Is. 49:3.  The latter two write that "The idea of a 'servant' played a small part in the earlier chapters, being used as a designation of the unworthy Eliakim in 22:20 and of the figure of David in 37:35, but it now comes to the fore as a description of major significance, the noun being used more than 20 times in chs. 40-55. Its first usage is obviously important in establishing the sense in which we are to understand it, and here it is clear that the community of Israel/Jacob is so described."

Text 
The original text was written in Hebrew language. This chapter is divided into 25 verses.

Textual witnesses
Some early manuscripts containing the text of this chapter in Hebrew are of the Masoretic Text tradition, which includes the Codex Cairensis (895), the Petersburg Codex of the Prophets (916), Aleppo Codex (10th century), Codex Leningradensis (1008).

Fragments containing parts of this chapter were found among the Dead Sea Scrolls (3rd century BC or later):
 1QIsaa: complete
 4QIsag (4Q61): extant verses 14‑25
 4QIsah (4Q62): extant verses 2, 4‑11
 4QIsai (4Q62a): extant verses 4‑11

There is also a translation into Koine Greek known as the Septuagint, made in the last few centuries BCE. Extant ancient manuscripts of the Septuagint version include Codex Vaticanus (B; B; 4th century), Codex Sinaiticus (S; BHK: S; 4th century), Codex Alexandrinus (A; A; 5th century) and Codex Marchalianus (Q; Q; 6th century).

Parashot
The parashah sections listed here are based on the Aleppo Codex. Isaiah 42 is a part of the Consolations (Isaiah 40–66). {P}: open parashah; {S}: closed parashah.
 {P} 42:1-4 {P} 42:5-9 {P} 42:10-13 {S} 42:14-17 {P} 42:18-25 [43:1-10 {S}]

Verse 1
"Behold! My Servant whom I uphold,
My Elect One in whom My soul delights!
I have put My Spirit upon Him;
He will bring forth justice to the Gentiles."
Cross references: Isaiah 44:1, Jeremiah 30:10, Matthew 12:18

The Synoptic Gospels each allude to verse 1 in their accounts of the Baptism of Jesus, when the Holy Spirit descends like a dove upon Jesus and a "voice from heaven" acclaims Him as "My Beloved Son, in whom I am well pleased." (Matthew 3:17;).

Verse 3
 A bruised reed shall he not break, and the smoking flax shall he not quench: he shall bring forth judgment unto truth.
In , Sennacherib, king of Assyria, had referred to Egypt as a "broken reed", criticising Israel's dependence on Egypt during the reign of king Hezekiah.
"Smoking" or "dimly burning"
"Quench" or "extinguish" from the Hebrew root: k-b-h (kabah, "to be quenched or extinguished, to go out"), is also used in Isaiah 1:31 and Isaiah 66:24 for: "the fire that shall not be quenched"; Isaiah 34:10: 'the fire devouring Edom "will not be quenched"'; as well as in 43:17: 'those who oppose the LORD'S path are "quenched like a wick"'.

Verse 4
He shall not fail nor be discouraged, till he have set judgment in the earth: and the isles shall wait for his law.

Verse 7
To open the blind eyes, to bring out the prisoners from the prison, and them that sit in darkness out of the prison house.
"Blind eyes": both physical and spiritual (Isaiah 29:18; 32:3; 35:5; 42:16, 18, 19), here may specially be for spiritual blindness by the comment of verses 16–19 (cf. Paul's calling in Acts 26:18). This is in contrast to Isaiah's own mission.
"To bring out the prisoners from the prison": cf. Isaiah 61:1-2. For different aspects of "prison", see "prisoners of hope" in Zechariah 9:11, and the "spirits in prison" in 1 Peter 3:19.

New Testament
In Matthew 12:17–21, Isaiah 42:1–4 is cited as a fulfillment of Isaiah's prophecies in the life and work of Jesus Christ:
 And great multitudes followed Him, and He healed them all. Yet He warned them not to make Him known, that it might be fulfilled which was spoken by Isaiah the prophet, saying:
"Behold! My Servant whom I have chosen,
My Beloved in whom My soul is well pleased!
I will put My Spirit upon Him,
And He will declare justice to the Gentiles.
He will not quarrel nor cry out,
Nor will anyone hear His voice in the streets.
A bruised reed He will not break,
And smoking flax He will not quench,
Till He sends forth justice to victory;
And in His name Gentiles will trust."

Islamic Interpretation 

Muslim tradition holds that Isaiah 42 predicted the coming of a servant associated with Qedar, the second son of Ishmael and who went on to live his life in Arabia, and so interpret this passage as a prophecy of Muhammad.

See also
Christian messianic prophecies
Christianity and Judaism
Jewish messianism
Messianic prophecies of Jesus
New Covenant
Related Bible parts: Isaiah 44, Isaiah 49, Isaiah 50, Isaiah 52, Isaiah 53, Jeremiah 30, Matthew 3; Matthew 12, Mark 1, Luke 3

References

Sources

External links

Jewish
Isaiah 42: Hebrew with Parallel English

Christian
Isaiah 42 English Translation with Parallel Latin Vulgate
Catholic Encyclopedia: Messiah
Israel, the Suffering Servant 

Old Testament theology
42
Christian messianism